Bhognadih is a village in the Barhait CD block in the Sahibganj subdivision of the Sahibganj district of the Jharkhand State, India. Bhognadih has a place in history, as the main centre of the Santhal rebellion.

History
The Santals settled in large numbers in the region called Damin-i-koh in the late 18th century to early 19th century and they came from Odisha, Chotanagapur and West Bengal. The industrious Santhals cleared the forests and brought large tracts of land under cultivation in the area between Bhagalpur and Birbhum. While the British collected the taxes, Bengali traders and money lenders poured in, other immigrants also came in. The Santhals were recklessly exploited. The Santhal rebellion or Hul, as it was locally known, first raised it head in 1855 in the Damin-i-koh area, against  the falsehood and negligence of the sahibs, extortion of the mahajans (money lenders), the corruption of the amla (officials) and oppression of the police. Their ire was particularly against the Bengali and other immigrants, collectively called Dikus.  Over a period of time, the Dikus  had acquired more and more of the land from the Santhals.

The first attack of the Santhals were against those who prospered at their cost. It was in the form of dacoities.  The ring leaders were punished. The Santal community was exasperated and more of them poured in from other areas in their support. The leadership was provided by four brothers – Sido, Kanhu, Chand and Bhairab – belonging to Bhognadih. The brothers claimed divine providence. On 30 June 1855, 10,000 Santhals are said to have gathered at Bhognadih, proclaiming their aims. A sense of fear swept across the non-Santhals, right up to Bhagalpur. A body of troops sent from Bhagalpur was defeated by the Santhals and they were the masters and started ravaging the country from Colgong to Rajmahal, and as far south as Raniganj and Sainthia. With more troops having superior fire-power being rushed in, the Santhals were pushed back to the forests and brutally suppressed. A large number of people along with all the leaders were killed.

Bhognadih, the village of the Santhal brothers, is very sacred for the Santhal community. There also is memorial for the brothers at Panchkatiya, where Sido and Kanhu were hanged.

Every year on the 30 June, a Shahid Mela is organised here, which has national level importance, to pay respect to the hul (rebellion) heroes.

Hul Divas
In the memory of Santhal Hul (rebellion), Hul Divas (Rebellion Day) is celebrated each year, specially among Santhal tribes. It is now a  custom that each year Chief Minister of Jharkhand state visit this place, and pay respect to Sidho and Kanho.

Future plan
The government of state is going to develop this village as historic site with modern facility.

Geography

Location

Overview
Rajmahal coalfield is shown in the map. The entire area is overwhelmingly rural with only small pockets of urbanisation.

Note: The full screen map is interesting. All places marked on the map are linked and you can easily move on to another page of your choice. Enlarge the map to see what else is there – one gets railway links, many more road links and so on.

Demographics
According to the 2011 Census of India, Bhognadih had a total population of 1,662, of which 807 (49%) were males and 855 (51%) were females. Population in the age range 0–6 years was 388. The total number of literate persons in Bhognadih was 565 (44.35% of the population over 6 years).

References

Cities and towns in Sahibganj district